Ambati Brahmanaiah (died 21 April 2013) was an Indian politician who was the MP for Machilipatnam 1999–2004, the MLA for Machilipatnam 1994–1999 (The other Contestants at that period are Perni Venkatramayya from Indian National Congress Party and Thota Chalapathi Rao), and Avanigadda (since 2009). He was also the leader of the TDP.

References

2013 deaths
Lok Sabha members from Andhra Pradesh
India MPs 1999–2004
People from Machilipatnam
1939 births
Telugu Desam Party politicians
People from Krishna district
Telugu politicians